Barry Shaw (born 31 October 1948) is an English former amateur footballer who played as a left winger in the Football League for Darlington, whom he joined from non-league club Crowborough Athletic. Shaw made two senior appearances for Darlington, both in the Fourth Division as a stand-in for regular winger Harry Kirk. His debut came on 20 April 1968, in a 2–0 home win against Rochdale, and he kept his place for the next match before Kirk returned to the side.

References

1948 births
Living people
People from Chilton, County Durham
Footballers from County Durham
English footballers
Association football wingers
Crowborough Athletic F.C. players
Darlington F.C. players
English Football League players